Wushu Association of India is the governing body of wushu in India. It was established in 1989 by Anand Kacker.  

The Department of Youth Affairs and Sports in the Ministry of Human Resource Development of the Government of India recognises the Wushu Association of India. It is a member of the International Wushu Federation, the Indian Olympic Association, the Wushu Federation of Asia, and the South Asian Wushu Federation.  

Bhupender Singh Bajwa is the president of the association.   

There are 39 units around India.

Medals won

References

External links 
 Wushu Association of India

Sports governing bodies in India
Wushu in India
Sports organizations established in 1989
Wushu governing bodies